Licking Cream is the third single by American rock band Sevendust from their second album Home. Also the song is the first single from Sevendust that was released in Europe. The song features additional vocals by singer Skin of the band Skunk Anansie.

Music video
The song music video directed by Ben Joe Dempsey. The video was made depicting the band playing in a dilapidated apartment building in Germany.

Track listings

Release history

References

1999 singles
1999 songs
Sevendust songs
Songs written by Clint Lowery
Songs written by Lajon Witherspoon
TVT Records singles
Songs written by Skin (musician)
Songs written by John Connolly (musician)
Songs written by Vinnie Hornsby
Songs written by Morgan Rose
Songs about drugs